The Eastern Sabah Security Command (ESSCOM) is a Malaysian security area that covers 1,400 km of the east coast of Sabah from Kudat to Tawau. It was established by Malaysian Prime Minister Dato' Seri Najib bin Abdul Razak and announced on 7 March 2013 by Musa Aman, the Sabah State Chief Minister. Its purpose is to strengthen maritime security in the eastern part of Sabah following the persistent attacks by pirates and militants in the southern Philippines especially after the 2013 Lahad Datu standoff, while at the same time ensuring that trade and business activity are not affected. The ESSCOM headquarters and main bases is at Lahad Datu.

On 8 July 2014, Former Prime Minister Najib Tun Razak announced the restructuring of the ESSCOM with the setting up of two major components - security and defence management as well as enforcement and public action.

Scope 
ESSCOM is the authoritative body that oversees Eastern Sabah Security Zone (ESSZONE), which comprises the districts of Kudat, Kota Marudu, Pitas, Beluran, Sandakan, Kinabatangan, Lahad Datu, Kunak, Semporna and Tawau. The body is chaired by the Chief Minister of Sabah, assisted by a CEO appointed by the government. ESSCOM's primary initiative is the establishment of new police stations to further improve security.

Expansion proposal 
In February 2014, the Malaysian government announced plans to further extend the ESSCOM area to reach Sarawak. Ministry of Defence Hishammuddin Hussein in his statement said discussions would be held with the government of Brunei, the Sarawak state government and oil and gas companies operating in the waters before the move was implemented.

Visits 
On 9 June 2014, around 20 students from the Royal College of Defence Studies (RCDS) visited ESSCOM headquarters to know the concept of the security area, particularly its integrated operations involving various agencies as well as procedures in dealing with challenges and issues that arise. The delegation was led by Major General Sir Sebastian John Lechmere Roberts along with other 19 senior military officers and civilians from various countries including Sudan, Lebanon, Italy, Estonia, Egypt, Ghana, Afghanistan, India, Pakistan, Kenya and the United Kingdom. On 25 August 2016, four Japanese delegates from the Japan Terrorism Prevention Unit also visited ESSCOM.

Director-General 
The Director-General of ESSCOM is selected on a rotational basis.

See also 
 Eastern Sabah Security Zone (ESSZONE)

References

External links 
 

Federal ministries, departments and agencies of Malaysia
Sabah
Military of Malaysia
Military units and formations established in 2013
2013 establishments in Malaysia
Prime Minister's Department (Malaysia)